The following highways are numbered 283:

Canada
Manitoba Provincial Road 283
 Quebec Route 283

Japan
 Japan National Route 283

United States
 Interstate 283
 U.S. Route 283
 Alabama State Route 283
 Arkansas Highway 283
 California State Route 283
 Georgia State Route 283
 Iowa Highway 283
Kentucky Route 283
 Maryland Route 283 (former)
 Missouri Route 283
 Montana Secondary Highway 283
 New Mexico State Road 283
 New York State Route 283
 Ohio State Route 283
 Pennsylvania Route 283
 South Carolina Highway 283
 Tennessee State Route 283
 Texas State Highway 283
 Farm to Market Road 283 (Texas)
 Utah State Route 283 (former)
 Virginia State Route 283
 Washington State Route 283